Larry Lee may refer to:

Larry Lee (American football) (born 1959), American football player
Larry Lee (baseball) (born 1959), American baseball coach
Larry Lee (musician) (1943–2007), American musician best known for his work with Al Green and Jimi Hendrix
Larry Dale Lee (1958–1999), American journalist murdered in Guatemala
Larry Lee Jr. (born 1953), American politician
Larry Lee (artist) (born 1962), Asian-American artist from Chicago
Larry Lee, American musician with the band The Ozark Mountain Daredevils

See also
Larry Lieber (born 1931), American comic book artist and brother of Stan Lee